The women's 4 x 100 metres relay event at the 1986 European Athletics Championships was held in Stuttgart, then West Germany, at Neckarstadion on 30 and 31 August 1986.

Medalists

Results

Final
31 August

Heats
30 August

Heat 1

Heat 2

Participation
According to an unofficial count, 41 athletes from 10 countries participated in the event.

 (4)
 (4)
 (4)
 (4)
 (4)
 (4)
 (4)
 (5)
 (4)
 (4)

References

4 x 100 metres relay
Relays at the European Athletics Championships
1986 in women's athletics